This article contains a list of fossil-bearing stratigraphic units in the state of Louisiana, U.S.

Sites

See also

 Paleontology in Louisiana

References

 

Louisiana
Stratigraphic units
Stratigraphy of Louisiana
Louisiana geography-related lists
United States geology-related lists
.